Lisa Raymond and Patrick Galbraith were the defending champions but lost in the semifinals to Mercedes Paz and Pablo Albano.

Manon Bollegraf and Rick Leach won in the final 3–6, 7–5, 7–6(7–3) against Mercedes Paz and Pablo Albano.

Seeds
Champion seeds are indicated in bold text while text in italics indicates the round in which those seeds were eliminated.

Draw

Final

Top half

Bottom half

References
1997 US Open – Doubles draws and results at the International Tennis Federation

Mixed Doubles
US Open (tennis) by year – Mixed doubles